Tsuen Wan Community Network is a local political group based in Tsuen Wan founded in 2015. In a historic pro-democracy landslide in 2019 District Council election, the group won one seat in the Tsuen Wan District Council.

History 
The group was formed in 2015 as a Tsuen Wan-based community group. Its leader Lam Sek-tim ran in the 2015 District Council election against Democratic Alliance for the Betterment and Progress of Hong Kong (DAB) legislator Chan Han-pan in Yeung Uk Road but lost. It was part of the Community Network Union, a localist political alliance of six community groups led by pro-independence Ventus Lau. The Tsuen Wan Community Network later quit the Union in 2018.

Lam Sek-tim ran in Yeung Uk Road in the 2019 District Council election again and defeated Chan Han-pan's successor Ng Chun-yu with narrow margin of 174 votes in the pro-democracy historic landslide victory.

Electoral performance

Tsuen Wan District Council elections

References

External links 
 

Political organisations based in Hong Kong
Political parties established in 2015
2015 establishments in Hong Kong
Liberal parties in Hong Kong
Localist parties in Hong Kong